Namgaychhoeling Gewog (Dzongkha: རྣམ་རྒྱས་ཆོས་གླིང་) is a gewog (village block) of Samtse District, Bhutan.

References

Gewogs of Bhutan
Samtse District